The Lo Nuestro Award for Tropical Salsa Male Artist of the Year (or Lo Nuestro Award for Tropical Male Artist of the Year) is an honor presented annually by American network Univision. The Lo Nuestro Awards were first awarded in 1989 and has been given annually since to recognize the most talented performers of Latin music. The nominees and winners were originally selected by a voting poll conducted among program directors of Spanish-language radio stations in the United States and also based on chart performance on Billboard Latin music charts, with the results being tabulated and certified by the accounting firm Deloitte. At the present time, the winners are selected by the audience through an online survey. The trophy awarded is shaped in the form of a treble clef. This category originally was awarded as Tropical Salsa Artist of the Year (1989-1992), and from 1993 onwards was separated as Female Artist of the Year and Male Artist of the Year.

The award was first presented to Puerto-Rican American singer Jerry Rivera in 1993. American performer Marc Anthony holds the record for the most awards with eight, out of fourteen nominations. Anthony has also received the Lo Nuestro Award for Pop Male Artist of the Year (2001). Puerto-Rican singer singers Rivera, Prince Royce, and Elvis Crespo, awarded three, four, and two times, respectively, are the only multiple winners beside Anthony. Performers Fonseca, Frankie Negrón, Romeo Santos and Tito El Bambino are the most nominated performers without a win, with three unsuccessful nominations each.

Winners and nominees
Listed below are the winners of the award for each year, as well as the other nominees for the majority of the years awarded.

References

Tropical Male Artist of the Year
Tropical musicians
Awards established in 1993